William or Bill Hoskins may refer to:
 William Hoskins (MP) for Westbury in 1555
 William Lawrence Hoskins (1828–1901), American politician
 William Hoskins (actor) (1816–1887), career in England, Australia and New Zealand
 William Hoskins (inventor) (1862–1934), American co-inventor of nichrome and modern billiard chalk
 W. G. Hoskins (William George Hoskins, 1908–1992), English local historian, academic and author
 Bill Hoskins (baseball) (1914–1975), American Negro league baseball player
 Will Hoskins (born 1986), English association football striker

See also
William Hosking, writer and architect